Joshua Carter Jackson (born June 11, 1978) is a Canadian-American actor. He is known for his starring role as Charlie Conway in Mighty Ducks, as Pacey Witter in The WB teen drama series Dawson's Creek (1998–2003), Peter Bishop in the Fox science fiction series Fringe (2008–2013), Cole Lockhart in the Showtime drama series The Affair (2014–2018), Mickey Joseph in the drama miniseries When They See Us (2019), Bill Richardson in the drama miniseries Little Fires Everywhere (2020), and Dr. Christopher Duntsch in Dr. Death (2021).

Jackson's best known films include The Mighty Ducks film series (1992–1996), Cruel Intentions (1999), The Skulls (2000), and Shutter (2008). For his performance in the Canadian independent film One Week (2008), Jackson won the Genie Award for Best Performance by an Actor in a Leading Role.

Early life
Jackson was born on June 11, 1978 in Vancouver to parents John and Fiona. His mother is a casting director. Jackson's father is from Texas, and his mother is a native of Ballyfermot, Dublin, Ireland, having immigrated to North America in the late 1960s. Joshua had a brief relationship with a "Julie D" but the fling didn't last long due to a difference of opinion on fashion and musical taste. He was a rocker, she was a raver.  He has a younger sister, Aisleagh, and two older half brothers, Jonathan and Lyman. He was raised Catholic.

Jackson lived in California until the age of 8. He moved to Vancouver with his mother and younger sister. He attended Ideal Mini School and later switched to Kitsilano Secondary School. He attended high school with actor Ryan Reynolds. In an interview with The New York Times, Jackson said he was kicked out of high school once because of The Jon Stewart Show: "[The show] played, at least where I grew up, at 1:30 in the morning, so I would stay up at night to watch Jon Stewart, but then I'd be too tired—or too lazy—to go to school in the morning. So I'd just take the first couple of classes off, 'cause I wanted to be fresh when I got there."

Career

Jackson started acting in a small role in the film Crooked Hearts in 1991. The next year, he played the role of Charlie in a musical version of Willie Wonka and the Chocolate Factory. At this point, with the help of the play's casting director Laura Kennedy, he joined the William Morris Agency. Soon after, he landed the role of Charlie (#96) in The Mighty Ducks series, playing a young and aspiring hockey player.

Jackson went on to appear as Pacey Witter on Dawson's Creek, which was created by Kevin Williamson and ran on the WB network from 1998 to 2003, and also starred James Van Der Beek, Michelle Williams, and Katie Holmes. While the show was on hiatus, he appeared in several movies including Cruel Intentions (an adaptation of Les Liaisons dangereuses that also starred Sarah Michelle Gellar and Ryan Phillippe), The Skulls, The Safety of Objects, The Laramie Project and a short cameo in the remake of Ocean's Eleven in which he appears as himself in a poker scene with Brad Pitt, George Clooney and Holly Marie Combs, among others. In 2000, he also guest-starred in Season 12 of The Simpsons, voicing the character of Jesse Grass, a "hunky environmentalist" and love interest for Lisa Simpson in the episode "Lisa the Tree Hugger". He also was cast as "Beau" in the movie Gossip in 2000 with actors James Marsden, Kate Hudson and Norman Reedus.

Shortly after Dawson's Creek ended in 2003, Jackson played the lead role in films alongside Dennis Hopper (Americano), Harvey Keitel (Shadows in the Sun), and Donald Sutherland (Aurora Borealis). In 2005, Jackson moved to the UK and made his stage debut on the London West End with Patrick Stewart in David Mamet's two-man play, A Life in the Theatre. The play was a critical and popular success, and ran from February to April of that year. Jackson said that he would consider returning to the stage, to try his hand on Broadway. His next film role was in Bobby, directed by Emilio Estevez, Jackson's co-star from The Mighty Ducks. He played a lead role in Shutter, a US remake of a Thai horror film of the same name. He starred and acted as executive producer in the Canadian independent film One Week, which opened on March 6, 2009.

From 2008 to 2013, Jackson played the lead role of Peter Bishop in the science-fiction series Fringe, created by JJ Abrams, Roberto Orci and Alex Kurtzman. The series appeared on the Fox TV network and was the second-highest rated new show of the 2008–2009 season after CBS's The Mentalist. BuddyTV ranked him #9 on its "TV's 100 Sexiest Men of 2010" list, #19 in 2011 and #14 in 2012.

Jackson was nominated for a Genie Award for Best Performance by an Actor in a Leading Role for the film One Week. He won the award on April 12, 2010. He held and hosted the satirical Pacey-Con in 2010, directly across the street from the San Diego Comic-Con, sporting a bowling shirt and giving out fan fiction, written by Dawson's Creek fans, to those waiting in the Comic-Con entrance line. Footage of the event was recorded for a video, entitled 'Pacey-Con', which he was filming for Will Ferrell's Funny or Die celebrity humor website. In 2013, Jackson appeared in the IFC film Inescapable with Marisa Tomei and Alexander Siddig. Jackson wrote the first story from the comic book trilogy Beyond the Fringe, titled "Peter and the Machine". Jackson starred in the successful Showtime television show, The Affair, where he played Cole Lockhart, the protagonist husband of the unfaithful Alison Lockhart.

In March 2018, Jackson made his theatrical debut on Broadway in Children of a Lesser God, where he played James Leeds, an unconventional teacher at a school for the deaf who gets in a conflicted professional and romantic relationship with a deaf former student, Sarah Norman (Lauren Ridloff). The play ran through May 2018.

In 2019, Jackson starred as defense attorney Mickey Joseph in the Netflix drama miniseries When They See Us.

In 2020, Jackson co-starred with Reese Witherspoon and Kerry Washington in Hulu's miniseries Little Fires Everywhere based on the novel by Celeste Ng.

Jackson has been cast as Christopher Duntsch, a neurosurgeon who was convicted of intentionally maiming his patients, in Dr. Death, based on the podcast of the same name.

In 2022, Jackson was set to lead the Paramount+ series Fatal Attraction with Lizzy Caplan, inspired by the 1980s thriller film of the same name.

Personal life

Jackson was in a relationship with Dawson's Creek co-star Katie Holmes during the first two seasons of the show's run. Holmes said that Jackson was her first love.

From 2006 to 2016, he was in a relationship with German actress Diane Kruger. 

Jackson began a relationship with British actress Jodie Turner-Smith in 2018. They married in December 2019 and have a daughter, born April 2020.

He owns his childhood home in Topanga, California. He previously lived in Wilmington, North Carolina, where Dawson's Creek was filmed; and in New York, where Fringe filmed its first season. In 2009, he moved back to Vancouver to shoot four seasons of the show before the last episode was aired on January 18, 2013.

Jackson is a fan of the Vancouver Canucks hockey team. He was arrested on November 9, 2002, at a Carolina Hurricanes hockey game in Raleigh, North Carolina, after a quarrel with a security guard. He was charged with assault, affray, and public intoxication and disruption, having a 0.14 blood alcohol content. Prosecutors agreed to dismiss the assault charge, and Jackson agreed to attend an alcohol education program and perform 24 hours of community service in order to have the remaining charge dropped.

Filmography

Film

Television

Stage

Awards and nominations

References

External links

 
 
 Joshua Jackson on The Hour with George Stroumboulopoulos

1978 births
Living people
20th-century American male actors
20th-century Canadian male actors
21st-century American male actors
21st-century Canadian male actors
Actors from Wilmington, North Carolina
American comics writers
American male child actors
American male film actors
American male television actors
American male voice actors
American people of Irish descent
American Roman Catholics
American television directors
Best Actor Genie and Canadian Screen Award winners
Canadian comics writers
Canadian emigrants to the United States
Canadian expatriate male actors in the United States
Canadian male child actors
Canadian male film actors
Canadian male television actors
Canadian male voice actors
Canadian people of American descent
Canadian people of Irish descent
Canadian Roman Catholics
Canadian television directors
Male actors from California
Male actors from North Carolina
Male actors from Seattle
Male actors from Vancouver
People charged with assault
People from Seattle
People from Topanga, California
Writers from California
Writers from Seattle
Writers from Vancouver